Teodor Rygier (9 October 1841, Warsaw - 18 December 1913, Rome) was a Polish sculptor known for his Adam Mickiewicz Monument in Kraków, Poland.

Life
Rygier studied in Warsaw, Dresden, Munich and in Vienna. In the years 1865-1866 he studied sculpture in Berlin and in Paris. Subsequently, Rygier lived and worked in Florence between 1873-1886, and from 1886 in Rome. The Academy of Fine Arts of St Petersburg named him an academic, while the Academies of Fine Arts of Florence, and Bologna nominated him an honorary associate.

A stipend won in Berlin, which allowed him to study in Paris. There he displayed a life sized statue of the Madonna at the Salon Exhibition in Paris of 1866. He then returned to Poland to found a factory for the production of terra cotta statues, but the factory fell victim to a fire. During 1867-1874, he also found patronage in Poland for the production of medallions and busts. In Warsaw exhibitions, he won awards in 1872 and 1873 for statues of Faith and Copernicus. He then completed among other works: a statue of the Immaculate Conception, a Coquette, a busts of the Madonna, and a bust of a girl titled il Sorriso.

In 1874, he settled in Florence. There he made a large bronze of the Risen Christ  Blessing the World. In 1875, he made two stucco bas-reliefs: a Christ before Pilate and a Descent from the Cross. He intended to complete the 14 Stations of the Passion in bronze, but was stymied by the expense.  In 1875, he sculpted a marble Madonna and child,  exhibited at the Salon of Paris. In 1881, he completes the statue of Regina Caelorum, who extends her arms to the entire world. The portraits by this artists includes the bust of Antonio Corazzi of Livorno. In 1874, he offered his larger-than-life marble bust of Copernicus to the Museo Copernicano of Rome, and a terracotta bust of Adam Mickievicz to an Academy in Bologna. Rygier made busts of his wife and sister; of George Washington (1875); of the poet Teofil Lenartowicz (exhibited at Rome in 1883); of the doctor Levitoni, philosopher of Warsaw; of Leopold Kronenberg (1878, once placed on a pedestal in the rail station to Warsaw); and the writer Kraszetcski.

In 1877-1879 he completed twelve larger than life statues for the Granzow Palace in Warsaw, including four caryatids sustaining a balcony; four statues of Four Seasons, and four depicting, Art, Science, Agriculture, and Industry. In contest of 1879, he designed three sculptural groups for the Palace of the Diet of Galizia: the Genius of Galizia, Civility, and Labor.  At the International competition of Moscow for the Monument to Alexander II, in October 1882, Rygier won 3rd prize for 3000 rubles. But the work was never completed.

The competition for Adam Mickiewicz Monument

The idea for a monument to a Polish national bard Adam Mickiewicz was put forward by university youth on the account of the return of his remains from Paris. In the years 1882-1888, a committee was set up to conduct a public competition for its design. Teodor Rygier, who took part in all three stages of the contest, was awarded the rights for its production by popular demand, ahead of over 60 artists including the renowned Cyprian Godebski, professor at the Imperial Academy of Arts in St. Petersburg from Paris, who won the first prize. The unveiling of the statue took exceptionally long time due to endless requests for revisions coming from the artistic committee. The monument was finally unveiled on 16 June 1898 for the 100th anniversary of Mickiewicz's birth.

The monument design is conventional for its time. The poet, raised on the pedestal, four symbolic groups are on the base: Motherland i.e. Poland (front), Science and learning – an old man with a boy (side on Florianska Street), Poetry (side facing Church of St. Wojciech), and Patriotic love or Valour (facing Sukiennice Hall). All bronze figures were cast in the Nellich foundry in Rome.

Aside from his statue of Adam Mickiewicz at the Main Market Square in Kraków, there is also one in the Old Town district, namely the bust of painter Juliusz Kossak featured in front of the Palace of Art at Planty Park.

See also
Adam Mickiewicz Monument, Lviv
Adam Mickiewicz Monument, Warsaw

References

  Piotr Szubert, Instytut Adama Mickiewicza, Sylwetki (sztuki wizualne):  Teodor Rygier February 2002
 Adam Mickiewicz Monument at the City's official website. 
 This article incorporates information from Polish Wikipedia 
  at In Your Pocket Ltd 
  The monument of Adam Mickiewicz at come2europe.eu 2006-2008
 The Warsaw Voice, All About Poland, Charm of Cracow 18 August 2005

Polish sculptors
Polish male sculptors
1841 births
1913 deaths
20th-century sculptors
19th-century sculptors
Burials at Campo Verano
Artists from Warsaw